What Would Diplo Do? is an American comedy television series created by Brandon Dermer and James Van Der Beek. The series stars James Van Der Beek, Dillon Francis, Dora Madison Burge, Jamar Malachi Neighbors, Bobby Lee and H. Michael Croner. The series premiered on Viceland on August 3, 2017.

Plot
Wesley "Diplo" Pentz is a dim-witted but good-natured DJ, producer, and record label head. The series follows Diplo as he performs, records, and lives life, often making mistakes by accident (such as spending the day with the wrong sick child) or on purpose (such as starting a Twitter beef with Calvin Harris).

Cast 
James Van Der Beek as Wesley "Wes" Pentz/"Diplo", a DJ and producer who runs the Mad Decent record label
Dillon Francis as Jasper, Diplo's overeager and drug-loving friend since middle school
Dora Madison Burge as Karen, Diplo's overworked personal assistant
Brandon Wardell as Sonny Moore/"Skrillex", a DJ and producer who runs the OWSLA record label 
Jamar Malachi Neighbors as Jamar, Diplo's social media manager
Bobby Lee as Brian, Diplo's road manager
H. Michael Croner as Kröner, Diplo's German assistant

Episodes

Reception 
On Rotten Tomatoes, the series has an aggregate score of 90% based on 9 positive and 1 negative critic reviews.  The website’s consensus reads: "James Van Der Beek excels with a vanity-free performance in What Would Diplo Do?, a sardonic takedown of DJ culture that is as observant as it is uncomfortably funny."

References

External links
 

2010s American comedy television series
2017 American television series debuts
English-language television shows
Viceland original programming
Television series by Matador Content
Television series based on singers and musicians